Beyond Midnight was a South African radio horror anthology series that ran from 1968 to 1970 on Springbok Radio. The program "was a replacement series for SF'68. Michael McCabe served as producer, and adapted stories for both series. Unlike its sci-fi predecessor, Beyond Midnight served up stories with a supernatural bent."  The show was sponsored by Biotex and futured the tagline "Just Soak, Just Soak, Just Soak in Biotex."

Episodes 
As the recordings of several episodes have been lost (especially towards the end of its run) and their plots are not available.

References

External links
Radio Horror Hosts
OTR Plot Spot: Beyond Midnight - plot summaries and reviews.

South African radio programs